Jan-Axel Alavaara (born 14 March 1975 in Kiruna, Sweden) is a retired professional Swedish professional ice hockey defenceman. After the 2011/2012 season Alavaara retired and became junior coach at MoDo Hockey Club.

Career statistics

Regular season and playoffs

External links
 

1975 births
Living people
Buffalo Sabres scouts
Grizzlys Wolfsburg players
Frölunda HC players
Modo Hockey players
People from Kiruna Municipality
Swedish expatriate ice hockey players in Germany
Swedish expatriate sportspeople in Switzerland
Swedish ice hockey defencemen
Swedish people of Finnish descent
Sportspeople from Norrbotten County